Laura Barrera Fortoul (born 10 May 1976) is a Mexican economist and politician affiliated with the PRI. Since September 1, 2021, she has served as Federal Deputy of the LXV Legislature of the Mexican Congress representing the Mexico state.

References

1976 births
Living people
Politicians from the State of Mexico
Women members of the Chamber of Deputies (Mexico)
Members of the Chamber of Deputies (Mexico)
Institutional Revolutionary Party politicians
21st-century Mexican politicians
21st-century Mexican women politicians
Deputies of the LXII Legislature of Mexico
Deputies of the LXV Legislature of Mexico
Deputies of the LXIV Legislature of Mexico